Caladenia mesocera, commonly known as the narrow-lipped dragon orchid, is a species of orchid endemic to the south-west of Western Australia. It has a single erect, hairy leaf and usually only one greenish-yellow and red flower with a relatively long, insect-like labellum. Its distribution is further inland than that of most other caladenias.

Description 
Flowering occurs from August to early October.

Taxonomy and naming 
Caladenia mesocera was first described in 2001 by Stephen Hopper and Andrew Phillip Brown and the description was published in Nuytsia. The specific epithet (mesocera) is said to be derived from the Greek words meso meaning "middle" and ceras meaning "horn", referring to the position of the horn-like glands between the labellum claw and claw connection, a feature that readily distinguishes Caladenia mesocera from C. barbarossa. The proper word for "middle" in ancient Greek is mesos (μέσος).

Distribution and habitat 
The narrow-lipped dragon orchid occurs between Bonnie Rock and Lake Moore east of Wubin, in the Avon Wheatbelt, Coolgardie, Geraldton Sandplains, Mallee and Yalgoo biogeographic regions where it grows near salt lakes and in other places that are moist in winter.

Conservation
Caladenia mesocera is classified as "not threatened" by the Western Australian Government Department of Parks and Wildlife.

References

mesocera
Orchids of Western Australia
Endemic orchids of Australia
Plants described in 2001
Endemic flora of Western Australia
Taxa named by Stephen Hopper
Taxa named by Andrew Phillip Brown